I Don't Want to Miss a Thing is the eighth studio album by American country music artist Mark Chesnutt, released in 1999. His last album for the Decca Records label, I Don't Want to Miss a Thing produced two singles on the Billboard Hot Country Songs charts, including a cover of the Diane Warren song of the same name, which reached Number One on the country charts, becoming the final Number One of his career thus far. The cover was also Chesnutt's biggest crossover, reaching Top 20 on the Billboard Hot 100. Only one other single was released from the album: "This Heartache Never Sleeps", which reached #17 on the country charts.

Track listing

Personnel

 Mike Brignardello – bass guitar
 Mark Casstevens – acoustic guitar
 Mark Chesnutt – lead vocals
 Tim Davis – background vocals
 Buddy Emmons – steel guitar
 Pat Flynn – acoustic guitar
 Larry Franklin – fiddle
 Paul Franklin – steel guitar
 Sonny Garrish – steel guitar
 Carl Gorodetzky – conductor
 Natalie Grant – background vocals
 Owen Hale – drums
 John Barlow Jarvis – organ, piano
 Kirk "Jelly Roll" Johnson – harmonica
 B. James Lowry – acoustic guitar
 Liana Manis – background vocals
 Brent Mason – electric guitar
 The Nashville String Machine – strings
 Steve Nathan – organ, piano, synthesizer
 Michael Rhodes – bass guitar
 Tom Roady – percussion
 Chris Rodriguez – background vocals
 Brent Rowan – electric guitar
 John Wesley Ryles – background vocals
 Wayne Toups – accordion
 Biff Watson – acoustic guitar
 Dennis Wilson – background vocals
 Lonnie Wilson – drums
 Glenn Worf – bass guitar
 Curtis Young – background vocals

Chart performance

Weekly charts

Year-end charts

References

1999 albums
Mark Chesnutt albums
Decca Records albums
Albums produced by Mark Wright (record producer)